The associate minister of finance is a member of the Canadian Cabinet who is responsible for various files within the Department of Finance Canada as assigned by the minister of finance.  

The incumbent is Randy Boissonnault, who also serves as the minister of tourism. 

This portfolio was introduced in the 29th Canadian ministry under Prime Minister Justin Trudeau.

List of associate ministers of finance

References

Finance, Associate